Gharanij is a Syrian town located in Abu Kamal District, Deir ez-Zor.  According to the Syria Central Bureau of Statistics (CBS), Gharanij had a population of 23,009 in the 2004 census.

On 9 December 2017, Gharanij was captured by Syrian Democratic Forces in their Deir ez-Zor campaign. On 21 December 2017, the Islamic State still controlled the town but was once again liberated by the Syrian Democratic Forces in late February.

References 

Populated places in Deir ez-Zor Governorate
Populated places on the Euphrates River